Hero of Israel is an Israeli military decoration that was awarded during the War of Independence.
When the IDF was first established in May 1948, a system of decorations had not yet been instituted, but many soldiers who had distinguished themselves in battle were recommended by their officers for awards. The army command installed a committee to decide on a system of decorations, and a contest was written out for the public to design medals. However, after more than a year, no decisions had been taken and in the summer of 1949 it was decided that, as a “temporary solution", 12 decorations would be awarded to a selection of soldiers who were representative for the different IDF units and who had distinguished themselves by the highest level of heroism.
  
The award ceremony was held on July 17, 1949. After a military parade, Israeli President Chaim Weizmann, Prime Minister David Ben-Gurion and IDF Chief of Staff Yaakov Dori awarded the decoration to the recipients or their dependents (4 awards were given posthumously).

After this ceremony, the committee continued to work on a system of decorations, but it was never brought to a solution and so the Hero of Israel ribbon was never awarded again. Instead, in 1970 it was replaced with the Medal of Valor. All recipients of the Hero of Israel automatically received the Medal of Valor as well.

Design
The decoration is designed in the form of a red ribbon bar, charged with a clasp of the Israeli coat of arms made of gold.

Recipients

References 

Military awards and decorations of Israel